KDNU-LD (channel 7) is a low-power television station in Las Vegas, Nevada, United States, serving as the West Coast flagship of the 24/7 headline news service NewsNet. It is owned and operated by Bridge Media Networks. The station's transmitter is located on Mount Arden in Henderson.

History
Built by the Trinity Broadcasting Network as an analog station in 1986, the station was sold to Enlace Christian Television in 2009, Craig A. Ruark, LLC in July 2021, and to LVNV Broadcasting Company, LLC in April 2022.

On September 26, 2022, NEWSnet's parent company Bridge Media Networks (backed by 5-hour Energy creator Manoj Bhargava) announced it would acquire KDNU-LD for $900,000. Upon the completion of the transaction, Bridge would make KDNU-LD the first NEWSnet owned-and-operated station in the West Coast (ironically, Scott Centers, the station's then-current owner, is also the Vice President of Broadcast Division at NEWSnet). The sale was consummated on November 16.

Technical information

Subchannels
The station's digital signal is multiplexed:

References

External links

Television channels and stations established in 1986
1986 establishments in Nevada
DNU-LD
Low-power television stations in the United States